The list of ship launches in 1884 includes a chronological list of some ships launched in 1884.


References

Sources

1884